The Preis der deutschen Filmkritik is a prize given by the German Film Critics Association, awarded to the best German films of the past year. The Preis der deutschen Filmkritik is the only German film prize issued exclusively by film critics. The announcement and award ceremony takes place at the Berlinale, and is conducted in cooperation with Moviepilot. The prizes for the best experimental film and for the best short film are awarded at the Media & Art Festival in Osnabrück and at the Dresden Film Festival, respectively. The Preis der deutschen Filmkritik was awarded irregularly from 1956 to 1963 in varying categories. From 1968, the prize was awarded regularly in the areas of feature (Spielfilm), short film (Kurzfilm) and documentary film (Dokumentarfilm). Since 2000, prizes are given in eleven categories

 Bester Spielfilm – best feature
 Bestes Spielfilmdebüt – best feature debut
 Beste Darstellerin – best actress
 Bester Darsteller – best actor
 Bester Dokumentarfilm – best documentary film
 Bestes Drehbuch – best screenplay
 Beste Kamera – best camera
 Beste Musik – best music
 Bester Schnitt – best cutting
 Bester Experimentalfilm – best experimental film
 Bester Kurzfilm – best short film
 Ehrenpreis – honor prize

Since 2006, an additional special prize has been awarded.

Winners 

The year indicates the year when the film was first shown. The prize is always awarded the following year.

2004 
 Bester Spielfilm: The Edukators by Hans Weingartner
 Bestes Spielfilmdebüt: Schultze Gets the Blues by Michael Schorr
 Beste Darstellerin: Julia Jentsch
 Bester Darsteller: August Diehl
 Bester Dokumentarfilm: Die Spielwütigen by Andres Veiel
 Bestes Drehbuch: Angela Schanelec for Marseille
 Beste Kamera: Manuel Mack for Gun-Shy
 Beste Musik: Andreas Grimm for Der Wixxer
 Bester Schnitt: Mona Bräuer for Hell on Wheels
 Bester Experimentalfilm: Zygose by Arndt Stepper and Gonzalo Arilla
 Bester Kurzfilm: Living a Beautiful Life by Corinna Schnitt

2005 
 Bester Spielfilm: Ghosts by Christian Petzold
 Bestes Spielfilmdebüt: Netto by Robert Thalheim
 Beste Darstellerin: Julia Jentsch
 Bester Darsteller: Axel Prahl
 Bester Dokumentarfilm: Into Great Silence by Philip Gröning
 Bestes Drehbuch: Holger Franke and Dani Levy for Alles auf Zucker!
 Beste Kamera: Hans-Günther Bücking for Schneeland
 Beste Musik: Hans Zimmer and Nick Glennie-Smith for 
 Bester Schnitt: Patricia Rommel for Off Beat
 Bester Experimentalfilm: You Killed the Undergroundfilm or The Real Meaning of Kunst bleibt... bleibt von Wilhelm Hein
 Bester Kurzfilm: Blackout by Maximilian Erlenwein

2006 
 Bester Spielfilm: Requiem by Hans-Christian Schmid
 Bestes Spielfilmdebüt: The Lives of Others by Florian Henckel von Donnersmarck
 Beste Darstellerin: Sandra Hüller in Requiem
 Bester Darsteller: Ulrich Mühe in The Lives of Others
 Bester Dokumentarfilm: Behind the Couch by Veit Helmer  and Deutschland. Ein Sommermärchen by Sönke Wortmann
 Bestes Drehbuch: Wolfgang Kohlhaase by  Summer in Berlin
 Beste Kamera: Hagen Bogdanski for The Lives of Others
 Beste Musik: Bert Wrede for Tough Enough
 Bester Schnitt: Patricia Rommel for The Lives of Others
 Bester Experimentalfilm: Daumenlutscherin by Ute Ströer
 Bester Kurzfilm: Detektive by Andreas Goldstein
 Spezialpreis: Brinkmanns Zorn by Harald Bergmann

2007 
 Bester Spielfilm: Yella, by Christian Petzold  
 Bestes Spielfilmdebüt: The Unpolished, by Pia Marais
 Beste Darstellerin: Maren Kroymann in 
 Bester Darsteller: Ulrich Noethen in My Führer – The Really Truest Truth about Adolf Hitler
 Bester Dokumentarfilm: Prater, by Ulrike Ottinger
 Bestes Drehbuch: Matthias Pacht and Alex Buresch for 
 Beste Kamera: Hans Fromm for Yella
 Beste Musik: Dieter Schleip for Die Hochstapler
 Bester Schnitt: Andrew Bird for The Edge of Heaven
 Bester Experimentalfilm: Wie ich ein freier Reisebegleiter wurde, by Jan Peters
 Bester Kurzfilm: Illusion, by Burhan Qurbani
 Spezialpreis: , by Nicolette Krebitz (director) and Bella Halben (camera)

2008 
 Bester Spielfilm: Jerichow by Christian Petzold
 Bestes Spielfilmdebüt: Nacht vor Augen by Brigitte Bertele
 Beste Darstellerin: Karoline Herfurth in A Year Ago in Winter
 Bester Darsteller: Elmar Wepper in Cherry Blossoms
 Bester Dokumentarfilm: Holunderblüte by Volker Koepp
 Bestes Drehbuch: Philipp Stölzl, Christoph Silber, Rupert Henning and Johannes Naber for North Face
 Beste Kamera: Kolja Brandt for North Face
 Beste Musik: Niki Reiser for A Year Ago in Winter
 Bester Schnitt: Andreas Wodraschke for 
 Bester Experimentalfilm: Falsche Freunde by Sylvia Schedelbauer 
 Bester Kurzfilm: Das heimliche Geräusch by Michael Watzke
 Spezialpreis: Klaas Akkermann (film promotion)

2009 
 Bester Spielfilm: The White Ribbon by Michael Haneke
 Bestes Spielfilmdebüt: Salami Aleikum by Ali Samadi Ahadi
 Beste Darstellerin: Birgit Minichmayr in Everyone Else
 Bester Darsteller: Burghart Klaußner in The White Ribbon
 Bester Dokumentarfilm: Achterbahn by Peter Dörfler
 Bestes Drehbuch: Michael Haneke for The White Ribbon
 Beste Kamera: Christian Berger for The White Ribbon
 Beste Musik: Fabian Römer for The Door
 Bester Schnitt: Hansjörg Weißbrich for Storm 
 Bester Experimentalfilm: Painting Paradise by Barbara Hlali
 Bester Kurzfilm: Heimspiel by Bogdana Vera Lorenz
 Ehrenpreis: Ron Holloway

2010 
 Bester Spielfilm: When We Leave by Feo Aladağ
 Bestes Spielfilmdebüt: When We Leave by Feo Aladağ
 Beste Darstellerin: Sibel Kekilli in When We Leave and Sophie Rois in Three
 Bester Darsteller: Devid Striesow in Three
 Bester Dokumentarfilm: Im Haus meines Vaters sind viele Wohnungen by Hajo Schomerus
 Bestes Drehbuch: Feo Aladağ for When We Leave 
 Beste Kamera: Judith Kaufmann for When We Leave 
 Beste Musik: Stéphane Moucha & Max Richter for When We Leave and Christoph M. Kaiser & Julian Maas for The Coming Days
 Bester Schnitt: Andrea Mertens for When We Leave
 Bester Experimentalfilm: Nacht um Olympia by Timo Schierhorn
 Bester Kurzfilm: Go Bash by Stefan Prehn and Stefan Eckel 
 Ehrenpreis: Heinz Badewitz

2011 
 Bester Spielfilm: Stopped on Track by Andreas Dresen
 Bestes Spielfilmdebüt: Almanya: Welcome to Germany by Yasemin Şamdereli
 Beste Darstellerin: Sandra Hüller in Above Us Only Sky
 Bester Darsteller: Milan Peschel in Stopped on Track
 Bester Dokumentarfilm: Pina by Wim Wenders
 Bestes Drehbuch: Yasemin und Nesrin Şamdereli for Almanya: Welcome to Germany 
 Beste Kamera: Daniela Knapp for The Poll Diaries 
 Beste Musik: Ingo Ludwig Frenzel for Lollipop Monster ex aequo Benedikt Schiefer for The City Below
 Bester Schnitt: Toni Froschhammer for Pina
 Bester Experimentalfilm: Bardzo by Gerhard Funk
 Ehrenpreis: Darius Ghanai (title designer)

2012 
 Bester Spielfilm: Barbara by Christian Petzold
 Bestes Spielfilmdebüt: A Coffee in Berlin by Jan-Ole Gerster
 Beste Darstellerin: Alina Levshin in Combat Girls
 Bester Darsteller: Lars Eidinger in Home for the Weekend
 Bester Dokumentarfilm: Das Ding am Deich byn Antje Hubert
 Bester Kinderfilm: Tom und Hacke by Norbert Lechner
 Bestes Drehbuch: Bernd Lange by Home for the Weekend 
 Beste Kamera: Jakub Bejnarowicz by Der Fluss war einst ein Mensch 
 Beste Musik: The Major Minors and Cherilyn MacNeil for A Coffee in Berlin
 Bester Schnitt: Bettina Böhler for Barbara
 Bester Kurzfilm: Die Schaukel des Sargmachers by Elmar Imanov
 Ehrenpreis: Christel and Hans Strobel for Verdienste on the German Kinderfilm
 Innovationspreis: Fred Kelemen for herausragende Bildgestaltung by Béla Tarrs Das Turiner Pferd

2013 
 Bester Spielfilm: Home from Home by Edgar Reitz
 Bestes Spielfilmdebüt: Nothing Bad Can Happen by Katrin Gebbe
 Beste Darstellerin: Antonia Lingemann in Bastard by Carsten Unger
 Bester Darsteller: Sascha Alexander Gersak in Nothing Bad Can Happen and Murat Kurnaz in 5 Jahre Leben
 Bester Dokumentarfilm: Der Banker: Master of the Universe by Marc Bauder
 Bester Kinderfilm: Sputnik by Markus Dietrich
 Bestes Drehbuch: Frauke Finsterwalder and Christian Kracht for Finsterworld by Frauke Finsterwalder
 Beste Kamera: Gernot Roll for Home from Home
 Beste Musik: Martin Todsharow for Sources of Life by Oskar Roehler
 Bester Schnitt: Anne Fabini for Houston by Bastian Günther
 Bester Experimentalfilm: Ein Gespenst geht um in Europa by Julian Radlmaier
 Bester Kurzfilm: Wie ist die Welt so stille by Susann Maria Hempel
 Ehrenpreis: Wilhelm Hein for his Engagement for the Undergroundkino and the independent and experimental Film

2014 
 Bester Spielfilm: Age of Cannibals by Johannes Naber
 Bestes Spielfilmdebüt: Fräulein Else by Anna Martinetz
 Beste Darstellerin: Liv Lisa Fries in Zurich and Staudamm
 Bester Darsteller: Sebastian Blomberg in Age of Cannibals
 Bester Dokumentarfilm: Deutschboden by André Schäfer
 Bester Kinderfilm: Rico, Oskar und die Tieferschatten by Neele Leana Vollmar
 Bestes Drehbuch: Stefan Weigl for Age of Cannibals
 Beste Kamera: Philip Gröning for The Police Officer's Wife
 Beste Musik: Sven Rossenbach and Florian van Volxem for Beloved Sisters
 Bester Schnitt: Claudia Wolscht for Beloved Sisters
 Bester Experimentalfilm: Femminielli by Nino Pezzella
 Bester Kurzfilm: Raimund – Ein Jahr davor by Hans-Dieter Grabe
 Ehrenpreis: Erika and Ulrich Gregor
 Sonderpreis der Dokumentarfilmjury: Heinz Emigholz for his work Photographie und jenseits

2015 
 Bester Spielfilm: The People vs. Fritz Bauer by Lars Kraume
 Bestes Spielfilmdebüt: Verfehlung by Gerd Schneider
 Beste Darstellerin: Laura Tonke in Hedi Schneider Is Stuck
 Bester Darsteller: Burghart Klaußner in The People vs. Fritz Bauer
 Bester Dokumentarfilm: Das Gelände by Martin Gressmann
 Bester Kinderfilm: Hördur by Ekrem Ergün
 Bestes Drehbuch: Dietrich Brüggemann for 
 Beste Kamera: Sturla Brandth Grøvlen for Victoria
 Beste Musik: Nils Frahm for Victoria
 Bester Schnitt: Vincent Assmann for Heil
 Bester Experimentalfilm: Schicht by Alexandra Gerbaulet
 Bester Kurzfilm: Stadt der Elefanten by Marko Mijatovic
 Ehrenpreis: Joachim von Mengershausen

2016 
 Bester Spielfilm: Toni Erdmann by Maren Ade
 Bestes Spielfilmdebüt:  by 
 Beste Darstellerin: Lilith Stangenberg in Wild
 Bester Darsteller: Josef Hader in Stefan Zweig: Farewell to Europe
 Bester Dokumentarfilm: Chamissos Schatten by Ulrike Ottinger
 Bestes Drehbuch: Maren Ade for Toni Erdmann
 Beste Kamera: Wolfgang Thaler for Stefan Zweig: Farewell to Europe
 Beste Musik: Levin Kärcher and Alula Araya for Beti und Amare
 Bester Schnitt: Heike Parplies for Toni Erdmann
 Bester Experimentalfilm: Havarie by Philip Scheffner
 Bester Kurzfilm: Telefon Santrali by Sarah Drath
 Ehrenpreis: Helke Misselwitz

References

German film awards
German film critics
Awards established in 1956
1956 establishments in Germany